Neptis rosa is a butterfly in the family Nymphalidae. It is found in Gabon.

References

 , 2007, Bulletin de la Société Entomologique de France 112 (4): 515-528 

Butterflies described in 2007
rosa
Endemic fauna of Gabon
Butterflies of Africa